Drilliola speyeri is an extinct species of sea snail, a marine gastropod mollusk in the family Borsoniidae.

Distribution
This fossil species was found in the Oligocene and the Lower Miocene of Aquitaine (Southwest France)

References

 Lozouet P. (2015). Nouvelles espèces de gastéropodes (Mollusca: Gastropoda) de l'Oligocène et du Miocène inférieur d'Aquitaine (Sud-Ouest de la France). Partie 5. Cossmanniana. 17: 15–84

speyeri
Gastropods described in 1872